The Kanowit language, also called Serau Tet Kanowit (language of the Kanowit people), is an Austronesian language spoken in Sarawak, Malaysia on the island of Borneo. It is mutually intelligible with the Tanjong (alternatively spelled Tanjung) language, which is spoken even farther upriver near the town of Kapit. Tanjong may be a separate language from Kanowit; however, both languages currently share the denomination kxn in ISO 639-3. Kanowit is primarily spoken in Kampung Bedil, a village located approximately one mile up the Rajang River from Kanowit Town.

Vocabulary 
Some Kanowit vocabulary translated into English:

References 

Languages of Malaysia
Melanau–Kajang languages
Endangered Austronesian languages